The 1991 Chicago Cubs season was the 120th season of the Chicago Cubs franchise, the 116th in the National League and the 76th at Wrigley Field. The Cubs finished fourth in the National League East with a record of 77–83.

Offseason
 November 21, 1990: Danny Jackson was signed as a free agent by the Cubs.
 December 6, 1990: George Bell was signed as a free agent by the Cubs.
 December 7, 1990: Dave Smith was signed as a free agent by the Cubs.
 December 17, 1990: Randy Kramer was released by the Cubs.
 March 29, 1991: Gary Varsho was traded by the Cubs to the Pittsburgh Pirates for Steve Carter.

Regular season

Season standings

Record vs. opponents

Notable transactions
 April 7, 1991: Mitch Williams was traded by the Cubs to the Philadelphia Phillies for Chuck McElroy and Bob Scanlan.
 September 29, 1991: Damon Berryhill and Mike Bielecki were traded by the Cubs to the Atlanta Braves for Turk Wendell and Yorkis Pérez.

Notable games
July 23: In a 6–4 victory over the Reds, Andre Dawson was ejected in the bottom of the seventh inning for arguing a called third strike by umpire Joe West. After Jim Essian was also ejected for arguing, Dawson proceeded to throw seventeen bats from the bat racks onto the field from the dugout. Dawson was fined $1,000 and suspended for one game.

Roster

Opening Day lineup
 CF 20 Jerome Walton
 2B 23 Ryne Sandberg
 1B 17 Mark Grace
 LF 11 George Bell
 RF 8 Andre Dawson
 C  9 Damon Berryhill
 SS 12 Shawon Dunston
 3B 25 Gary Scott
 P 32 Danny Jackson

Schedule

Player stats

Batting

Starters by position
Note: Pos = Position; G = Games played; AB = At bats; H = Hits; Avg. = Batting average; HR = Home runs; RBI = Runs batted in

Other batters
Note: G = Games played; AB = At bats; H = Hits; Avg. = Batting average; HR = Home runs; RBI = Runs batted in

Pitching

Starting pitchers
Note: G = Games pitched; IP = Innings pitched; W = Wins; L = Losses; ERA = Earned run average; SO = Strikeouts

Other pitchers
Note: G = Games pitched; IP = Innings pitched; W = Wins; L = Losses; ERA = Earned run average; SO = Strikeouts

Relief pitchers
Note: G = Games pitched; W = Wins; L = Losses; SV = Saves; ERA = Earned run average; SO = Strikeouts

Farm system

Notes

External links
1991 Chicago Cubs season at Baseball Reference

Chicago Cubs seasons
Chicago Cubs season
Chicago Cubs